Rafiabad may refer to:

Iran
 Rafiabad, Fars
 Rafiabad, Isfahan
 Rafiabad, Kerman
 Rafiabad, alternate name of Borz-e Rafiabad, Kerman Province
 Rafiabad, Khuzestan
 Rafiabad, Mazandaran

India
 Rafiabad, India, a town in Jammu and Kashmir